Theodore George Romzha (14 April 1911 – 31 October 1947) was the bishop of the Ruthenian Catholic Eparchy of Mukacheve from 1944 to 1947. Assassinated by the NKVD, he was beatified as a martyr by Pope John Paul II on 27 June 2001.

Early life
Theodore Romzha was born on 14 April 1911 in Nagybocskó, a village in Subcarpathia, Austria-Hungary (today Velykyi Bychkiv, Ukraine), inhabited by Rusyns and Hungarians. In his baptism certificate, his name is recorded as Tivadar György, and his nationality as Hungarian.

His father, Pavel Romzha, worked as an official of the railroad. His mother, born Maria Semack, was a full-time homemaker. Like many ambitious families in the region, the Romzhas spoke the Hungarian language at home. In the presence of others, however, they switched to the Ukrainian language. After his graduation from the Gymnasium in Chust (today Khust), and with the help of Péter Gebé, Theodore left to study for the priesthood in Rome. He began as a seminarian at the Collegium Germanicum et Hungaricum, and later switched to the Russicum. He finished his theological studies at the Papal Gregorian University in Rome.

Theodore was ordained a priest by Bishop Alexander Evreinov of the Russian Greek Catholic Church on Christmas Day, 1936 in the Basilica of St Mary Major. After completing his compulsory military service in the Czechoslovak Army, he served briefly as a pastor in several Subcarpathian parishes in Berezovo and Nizhny Bystriy before being assigned as professor of philosophy at the Eparchial Seminary in Ungvár (today Uzhhorod) in 1939.

Episcopate
These were difficult years for the Church in Subcarpathia as the region, having been a part of Czechoslovakia since 1920, was returned to Hungary in 1938 as the result of the First Vienna Award, then briefly occupied by Nazi Germany before the arrival of the Red Army, eventually becoming part of the Soviet Union.

During these turbulent times, Theodore Romzha treated nationalities and languages as equal. To all his priests he spoke in their native language, and he used his name in the form of Tódor in Hungarian texts.

On 24 September 1944, with the region was under Nazi occupation, at the young age of 33, Romzha was consecrated bishop and appointed apostolic administrator of the Eparchy of Munkács (now Mukacheve) in the cathedral of Ungvár by Bishop Miklós Dudás, O.S.B.M., in co-consecration by János Scheffler, Hungarian Greek Catholic bishop of Szatmár (today Satu Mare), and István Madarász, Hungarian Greek Catholic bishop of Kassa (today Košice). He immediately had to face the Soviet Red Army, which occupied the churches, assigned them to the Russian Orthodox Church, and arrested priests. Bishop Romzha refused to break with the Pope in front of General Petrov.

He organized a celebration of the Feast of the Assumption with the participation of more than 80,000 pilgrims but this was not tolerated by the Communist officials who now began plotting to dispose of the young bishop. On 27 October 1947, on the way home from a parish visitation, Bishop Romzha's horse-drawn carriage was purposely rammed by a Soviet military truck and pushed off the side of the road. The soldiers, who were dressed as civilians, jumped from the truck and beat the bishop and his companions.

Soon after the brutal assault began, a civilian truck came upon the scene and the assailants fled. Romzha and his companions were taken to Uzhhorod, where they were hospitalized. Romzha was making good progress when, late on the night of 31 October, the nuns who were nursing him were suddenly dismissed and a new nurse was assigned to him by the regime. A little after midnight Moscow Time, Romzha was found dead. The nurse had poisoned Romzha with an injection of curare provided by the head of NKVD Laboratory 12, Dr Grigory Mairanovsky. According to research in Soviet archives by Yevgenia Albats, the Bishop's murder was personally ordered by Nikita Khrushchev.

On 4 November 1947, a large crowd attended Romzha's funeral, despite Soviet efforts to shut down and block public transportation. He was buried in the crypt of the Holy Cross Cathedral in Uzhhorod. The Ruthenian Catholic Church was relentlessly persecuted and in 1949, it was officially suppressed. All of its properties were allocated to the Russian Orthodox Church.

Feast day and relics

Romzha was beatified as a Martyr for the Faith by Pope John Paul II in Lviv on 27 June 2001, with 1 November assigned initially as his feast day. At the request of the Eparchy of Mukacheve, the Congregation for the Oriental Churches transferred the feast day to 31 October, effective 2009. Romzha died shortly after midnight 1 November, according to Moscow Time, the Soviet-imposed time zone throughout Ukraine from 1930 to 1990; however, according to local time, Romzha died before midnight on 31 October.

In 1998, the relics of Blessed Theodore were found in a tomb in the crypt of Holy Cross Cathedral in Uzhhorod, and then transported to Budapest, Hungary for medical examination. On 27–28 June 2003 his relics were translated and carried in solemn procession back to Uzhhorod, where they are enshrined in a side chapel at Holy Cross Cathedral. In commemoration of the event, a second feast day, the Translation of the Holy Relics of Blessed Theodore Romzha, is celebrated on 28 June.

Pavlo Sudoplatov's Letter 
In a letter from Pavlo Sudoplatov, General of state security, to delegates of the 23rd Assembly of the Communist Party of the Soviet Union, he stated that, "According to the instructions of the Kruschev, a member of the Politburo [Central Committee of the Communist Party] of Ukraine and the first secretary in Ukraine and approved by Khruschev, Romzha was eliminated in Mukachiv. The head of the Greek Catholic Church, he had actively opposed the uniting of Greek Catholics to Orthodoxy."

Notes

Further reading

Fr. Christoper Zugger, Finding a Hidden Church, Eastern Christian Publications, Fairfax, Virginia, 2009.

External links
 Biography of Theodore Romzha, ewtn.com
 Official web page Vatican website
 Official web page Vatican, vatican.va 

1911 births
1947 deaths
20th-century Eastern Catholic martyrs
People from Zakarpattia Oblast
Rusyn people
Hungarian Eastern Catholics
Ruthenian Catholic bishops
Eastern Catholic beatified people
Ukrainian beatified people
Beatifications by Pope John Paul II
Burials at the Greek Catholic Cathedral, Uzhhorod
People killed in NKVD operations
Soviet people of Hungarian descent